Jesse Russell Orosco (born April 21, 1957) is a Mexican-American former relief pitcher in Major League Baseball who holds the major league record for career pitching appearances, having pitched in 1,252 games. He pitched most notably for the New York Mets in the 1980s and made the NL All-Star team in 1983 and 1984. He won a World Series in 1986 with the Mets and in 1988 with the Dodgers. He threw left-handed, but batted right-handed. He retired in 2003 after having been with the Mets, Dodgers, Cleveland Indians, Milwaukee Brewers, Baltimore Orioles, St. Louis Cardinals, San Diego Padres, New York Yankees, and Minnesota Twins. He retired when he was 46 years old, one of the oldest players to still be playing in the modern age. Orosco is one of only 31 players in baseball history to date to have appeared in Major League games in four decades.

Orosco's longevity was greatly aided by the increasing use of left-handed specialist relief pitchers from the 1990s onward; in his last several years, he was used almost exclusively in this role.

Biography
Orosco was drafted out of Santa Barbara City College by the Minnesota Twins in the 1978 Major League Baseball Draft. In February , the Twins traded Orosco to the New York Mets to complete a deal that had sent veteran starter Jerry Koosman to Minnesota two months earlier.

Orosco made his debut on April 5, 1979, with the Mets.

Orosco had his best seasons in the early and mid-1980s with the Mets. He had a career-best 1.47 ERA in 1983. That year, he also won 13 games and saved 17, with 110 innings pitched, making his first All-Star Team and finishing third in the National League Cy Young Award voting. He had 31 saves in 1984, which was 3rd in the National League, and went 10–6 in 60 appearances; good enough for his second All-Star selection. In 1985, he began sharing closing duties for the Mets with right-hander Roger McDowell, giving the Mets a vaunted lefty–righty combo coming out of the bullpen to close games.

In 1983, Orosco became just the third and, to date, the last Mets pitcher to record two wins in the same day. This feat had been accomplished by Craig Anderson in 1962 and Willard Hunter in 1964. On July 31, 1983, Banner Day, the Mets won both games of a double-header against the Pirates in extra-inning walk-off wins. Orosco pitched the last four innings of the first game and the final inning of the second game, and both times was the pitcher of record when the Mets rallied to win.

Orosco's clutch relief pitching in the  postseason was one of the key reasons the Mets won the World Series. He was on the mound for the final pitch of the final game of both the NLCS against the Houston Astros, and the World Series against the Boston Red Sox. Orosco ended both series by striking out the final batter. Orosco also provided one of the most memorable images of that World Series and it would become an iconic image to the Mets and their fans: after striking out Marty Barrett to end the series, he threw his glove way up in the air and immediately dropped to his knees while catcher Gary Carter ran out to the mound to embrace him. The photo was taken by Mets photographer George Kalinsky, who was also the photographer at Madison Square Garden. For many years, this was the final scene shown during the ending credits of the syndicated Major League Baseball news show This Week in Baseball. Having also become the first (and only) relief pitcher to get three wins in one playoff series (which he accomplished in the NLCS against the Astros), Orosco would primarily be remembered for that year.

Coincidentally, Jerry Koosman, whom the Mets had traded to Minnesota in the deal that brought Orosco to New York, was on the mound for the final out of the 1969 World Series—to date, the only other Fall Classic the Mets have won. The final batter in that World Series, Davey Johnson, would be Orosco's manager on the 1986 World Series team.

At his peak, Orosco was virtually unhittable against left-handed batters. Rob Neyer later wrote that Orosco stayed in the majors for almost a quarter-century because of "his ability to make lefties look foolish."

After getting traded away by the Mets in a huge deal involving over seven players, he found a very brief one-year home with the Dodgers (where he won the 1988 World Series), and then signed with Cleveland and stayed there for three years.

His only real recognizable home besides the Mets came in Baltimore when he stayed with the Orioles for the latter half of the 1990s. While his best seasons came in New York, he had an excellent 1997 season, finishing with a 2.32 ERA, his best since the 1980s.

On June 25, 1999, Orosco set the all-time record for major league relief appearance with 1,051, passing Kent Tekulve.

In 2003, he was on three different teams and finished with 33 innings pitched. The 2003 season also marked his return to New York, this time though with the Yankees. He was traded to the Yankees from the San Diego Padres for a player to be named later. He played his last game on September 27, 2003 with the Twins. He signed with the Arizona Diamondbacks for the 2004 season but decided to retire before spring training. He was eligible for the Baseball Hall of Fame in 2009; however, his lifetime stats made him a longshot for the Hall and he dropped off the ballot after only one year. He was the last active MLB player from the 1970s, outlasting Rickey Henderson (the last active position player) by just over a week. While Henderson got inducted on the first ballot, Orosco was off future Baseball Writers' Association of America ballots after only receiving one vote.

, he is the only player in Major League history with more than 1,200 games pitched or more than 1,000 inherited runners.

See also

List of oldest Major League Baseball players
List of Major League Baseball players who played in four decades

References

External links

Retrosheet

1957 births
Living people
American baseball players of Mexican descent
Baltimore Orioles players
Baseball players from California
Cleveland Indians players
Elizabethton Twins players
Jackson Mets players
Las Vegas 51s players
Los Angeles Dodgers players
Major League Baseball pitchers
Memphis Redbirds players
Milwaukee Brewers players
Minnesota Twins players
National League All-Stars
New York Mets players
New York Yankees players
Peoria Chiefs players
San Diego Padres players
Santa Barbara City Vaqueros baseball players
Sportspeople from Santa Barbara, California
St. Louis Cardinals players
Tiburones de La Guaira players
American expatriate baseball players in Venezuela
Tidewater Tides players